Alz or ALZ may refer to:

 Alzheimer's disease (shorthand "ALZ" used by Alzheimer's Association)
Alz, a river in Bavaria, Germany
ALZip, a computer archive and compression utility
Alitak Seaplane Base, a seaplane base with the IATA code ALZ
ALZ (steelworks), Belgian steelworks
Alur language (ISO 639-3 language code alz)
The Armée de Liberation de Zgharta (ALZ), Lebanese political party and militia